Commissaris's long-tongued bat (Glossophaga commissarisi) is a bat species from South and Central America.

Description
The bat's length ranges from 43 to 65 mm, has a wingspan of 32 to 42 mm, and weighs on average 9.3 to 9.5 grams. Colour varies from dark, light, and reddish, brown. The species presents no sexual dimorphism, and has a long tongue with bristle-like papillae.

Habitat and range
It is found from Southern Mexico to Panama, as well as in Guyana. Its habitats range from tropical to sub-tropical.

References

Bats of South America
Bats of Brazil
Mammals of Colombia
Bats of Central America
Glossophaga
Mammals described in 1962